The 1995 NCAA Division I-A football season was the first year of the Bowl Alliance.

Tom Osborne led Nebraska to its second straight national title with a victory over Florida in the Fiesta Bowl.

This matchup was only possible because of the new Bowl Alliance. Under the old system, Nebraska would have been tied to the Orange Bowl and Florida to the Sugar Bowl. The Bowl Alliance created a national championship game which would rotate between the Orange, Sugar, and Fiesta Bowls free of conference tie-ins and featuring the No. 1 and No. 2 teams as chosen by the Bowl Alliance Poll. The Pac-10 and Big Ten chose not to participate, keeping their tie-ins with the Rose Bowl.

Nebraska was a football dynasty, playing in its third consecutive national title game, and became the first school to claim back-to-back titles since the 1970s. This was a dominant Nebraska team, averaging 52 points per game and a 39-point average margin of victory, including a 62–24 victory over Florida. This lopsided victory came after Florida was picked by many sportswriters to win the game.

Ohio State almost created a national title controversy, going into its final regular season game against Michigan undefeated and ranked No. 2. Had they finished the season No. 2 the Bowl Alliance would have been unable to pit No. 1 vs. No. 2 as the Big Ten champ was tied to the Rose Bowl. However, Michigan upset Ohio State. Buckeye running back Eddie George still won the Heisman Trophy.

Things were lively in the state of Florida, where the Florida Gators won their third straight SEC championship. Florida State started the season No. 1, but lost an ACC game for the first time ever when Virginia stopped a last-minute drive a few inches from the end zone, knocking them out of the national title race.

However, Northwestern was able to steal the show as the year's Cinderella story. Its only regular season loss came against Miami-OH.  Northwestern began the season with an upset of Notre Dame and went on to defeat Michigan and Penn State later in the season. Undefeated in the Big Ten after decades as a doormat, the Wildcats went on to face USC in the Rose Bowl. However, the Wildcats lost to the Trojans in what was a see-saw game until USC pulled away in the fourth quarter.

Miami and Alabama had to sit the post season out, as they were on NCAA probation.

The Southwest Conference played its final game ever, an 18–17 Houston win over Rice. Four of its members would join the Big 8 to form the Big 12; the other four were split between the WAC and the newly formed Conference USA.

The Hall of Fame Bowl, originally played in Birmingham, then moved to Tampa, Florida gained corporate sponsorship, and was now known as the Outback Bowl. The Freedom Bowl was discontinued and the Holiday Bowl absorbed its WAC tie-in.

The first ever Division I-A overtime game was played during the 1995 bowl season, the Las Vegas Bowl between Toledo and Nevada. Overtime would be adopted permanently for all games in 1996.  Due to the adoption of overtime, the season-ending 3–3 game between Wisconsin and Illinois on November 25 is the last tied game in Division I-A.

Rule changes
  Overtime was introduced for bowl games only in Division I-A.  The system is similar to one used in lower division postseason games; Each team gets one possession at the defense's 25 yard line per overtime period and continues until the tie is broken.
 Unsportsmanlike conduct penalties will be assessed on any player who removes his helmet in the field of play other than due to injury.
 A player who receives two unsportsmanlike conduct penalties in the same game is automatically disqualified.
 Officials were instructed to strictly enforce anti-taunting and anti-showboating rules passed in the 1991 season and amended in the 1993 season.
 The home team is allowed to wear white jerseys if they receive written permission from the visiting school in advance, rescinding the 1983 rule requiring the visitors to wear white. This rule was personally lobbied by new LSU coach Gerry DiNardo, since the Bayou Bengals wore white at home from the late 1950s through 1982. The Southeastern Conference adjusted the rule in 1997 for conference games, when it stated the home team would receive first choice of jersey color, regardless of the visiting team's wishes.

Conference and program changes
One team upgraded from Division I-AA prior to the season. As such, the total number of Division I-A schools increased to 108. 
Pacific decided to drop their football team after the completion of the 1995 season.

Regular Season

August–September
Florida State was the top-ranked team in the preseason AP Poll, with defending champion Nebraska at No. 2 followed by No. 3 Texas A&M, No. 4 Penn State, and No. 5 Florida.

August 31-September 2: No. 1 Florida State opened their season with a 70-26 blowout of Duke. No. 2 Nebraska was just as dominant, winning 64–21 at Oklahoma State. No. 3 Texas A&M defeated LSU 33–17. No. 4 Penn State had not started their schedule. No. 5 Florida beat Houston 45–21. The top five remained the same in the next poll.

September 9: No. 1 Florida State won 45–26 at Clemson, and No. 2 Nebraska visited Michigan State for a 50–10 victory. No. 3 Texas A&M was idle. No. 4 Penn State struggled against Texas Tech, winning 24–23 on a field goal with four seconds left. No. 5 Florida beat Kentucky 42–7 in Lexington. No. 6 Auburn overwhelmed Chattanooga 76-10 and moved up in the next poll: No. 1 Florida State, No. 2 Nebraska, No. 3 Texas A&M, No. 4 Florida, and No. 5 Auburn.

September 16: No. 1 Florida State and No. 2 Nebraska continued their dominant performances, respectively defeating North Carolina State 77-17 and Arizona State 77–28. No. 3 Texas A&M also piled on the points, beating Tulsa 52–9, and No. 4 Florida showed similar firepower with a 62–37 win over No. 8 Tennessee. In contrast, No. 5 Auburn found themselves in a defensive struggle at LSU, and the Bayou Bengals prevailed 12–6. No. 6 USC beat Houston 45-10 and moved up in the next poll: No. 1 Florida State, No. 2 Nebraska, No. 3 Texas A&M, No. 4 Florida, and No. 5 USC.

September 23: No. 1 Florida State defeated Central Florida 46–14, and No. 2 Nebraska beat Pacific 49–7. No. 3 Texas A&M lost 29–21 at No. 7 Colorado even after Buffaloes quarterback Koy Detmer was sidelined with a torn ACL. No. 4 Florida was idle, and No. 5 USC won 31–10 at No. 25 Arizona. The next poll featured No. 1 Florida State, No. 2 Nebraska, No. 3 Florida, No. 4 Colorado, and No. 5 USC.

September 30: No. 1 Florida State was idle. After winning all their previous games by 40 points or more, No. 2 Nebraska had “only” a two-touchdown margin of victory in their 35–21 defeat of Washington State. No. 3 Florida beat Mississippi 28–10, No. 4 Colorado won 38–17 at No. 10 Oklahoma, No. 5 USC shut out Arizona State 31–0, and No. 7 Ohio State defeated No. 15 Notre Dame 45–26. The next poll featured No. 1 Florida State, No. 2 Nebraska, No. 3 Florida, and No. 4 Colorado, with USC and Ohio State tied at No. 5.

October
October 7: No. 1 Florida State defeated Miami 41–17. No. 2 Nebraska was idle. No. 3 Florida won 28–10 at No. 21 LSU, but No. 4 Colorado fell 40–24 to No. 24 Kansas. No. 5 Ohio State made a late comeback to beat No. 12 Penn State 28–25, while fellow No. 5 USC was a 26-16 winner at California. The next poll featured No. 1 Florida State, No. 2 Nebraska, No. 3 Florida, No. 4 Ohio State, and No. 5 USC.

October 14: No. 1 Florida State dropped 70 points on an opponent for the third time in six games, winning 72–13 over Wake Forest. No. 2 Nebraska kept up the pace with a 57–0 shutout of Missouri. No. 3 Florida visited No. 7 Auburn and won 49–38. No. 4 Ohio State made another fourth-quarter comeback to ensure a 27–16 win at No. 21 Wisconsin, their fifth ranked opponent in six games. No. 5 USC defeated Washington State 26–14. The top five remained the same in the next poll.

October 21: No. 1 Florida State beat Georgia Tech 42–10, while No. 2 Nebraska defeated No. 8 Kansas State 49–25. No. 3 Florida was idle. No. 4 Ohio State shut out Purdue 28–0, but No. 5 USC fell 38–10 at No. 17 Notre Dame. No. 6 Tennessee was idle but moved up in the next poll: No. 1 Florida State, No. 2 Nebraska, No. 3 Florida, No. 4 Ohio State, and No. 5 Tennessee.

October 28: No. 1 Florida State was idle. No. 2 Nebraska won 44–21 at No. 7 Colorado, No. 3 Florida visited Georgia for a 52–17 victory, No. 4 Ohio State beat No. 25 Iowa 56–35, and No. 5 Tennessee defeated South Carolina 56–21. After two straight blowouts of highly rated opponents, Nebraska moved to the top spot in the next poll: No. 1 Nebraska, No. 2 Florida State, No. 3 Florida, No. 4 Ohio State, and No. 5 Tennessee.

November–December
November 2–4: No. 1 Nebraska overwhelmed Iowa State 73–14. The biggest upset of the season occurred in Charlottesville, where No. 24 Virginia hosted No. 2 Florida State. The Seminoles had dominated the ACC ever since they joined the league in 1992; in fact, they had not lost a single conference game in their three and a half years of membership. However, the streak came to an end with a 33-28 Cavaliers victory, as Florida State's Warrick Dunn fell just short of a game-winning touchdown as time ran out. No. 3 Florida defeated Northern Illinois 58–20, No. 4 Ohio State won 49–21 at Minnesota, and No. 5 Tennessee shut out Southern Mississippi 42–0. No. 6 Northwestern, a surprise contender for the Big Ten title, beat No. 12 Penn State 21-10 and moved into the top five: No. 1 Nebraska, No. 2 Ohio State, No. 3 Florida, No. 4 Tennessee, and No. 5 Northwestern.

November 11: No. 1 Nebraska visited No. 10 Kansas and won 41–3 to sew up the Big 8 title. No. 2 Ohio State defeated Illinois by the same 41-3 margin. No. 3 Florida won 63–7 at South Carolina to clinch a spot in the SEC Championship Game. No. 4 Tennessee was idle, and No. 5 Northwestern beat Iowa 31–20. The top five remained the same in the next poll.

November 18: No. 1 Nebraska was idle. No. 2 Ohio State won 42–3 over Indiana, and No. 3 Florida defeated Vanderbilt 38–7. No. 4 Tennessee needed a fourth-quarter comeback to edge Kentucky 34–31, while No. 5 Northwestern had an easier time of it with a 23–8 victory at Purdue. The Wildcats moved ahead of the Volunteers in the next poll: No. 1 Nebraska, No. 2 Ohio State, No. 3 Florida, No. 4 Northwestern, and No. 5 Tennessee.

November 24–25: No. 1 Nebraska put an exclamation point on their dominant regular season with a 37–0 shutout of rival Oklahoma. An even bigger rivalry game took place the next day, when No. 2 Ohio State visited No. 18 Michigan. For the second time in three years, the Wolverines spoiled the Buckeyes’ shot at an undefeated season, as 313 rushing yards by Tim Biakabutuka and two second-half interceptions by Charles Woodson led to a 31-23 Michigan win. No. 4 Northwestern, who had finished their regular-season schedule, received the Rose Bowl berth which would have gone to Ohio State if the Buckeyes had defeated their nemeses. Meanwhile, No. 3 Florida beat No. 6 Florida State 35-24 and No. 5 Tennessee won 12–7 over Vanderbilt. The next poll featured No. 1 Nebraska, No. 2 Florida, No. 3 Northwestern, No. 4 Tennessee, and No. 5 Ohio State.

December 2: No. 2 Florida was heavily favored to defeat No. 23 Arkansas in the SEC Championship Game, and the Gators did not disappoint, blowing out the Razorbacks 34–3 to complete an undefeated regular season. The final pre-bowl AP Poll featured No. 1 Nebraska, No. 2 Florida, and No. 3 Northwestern, with Tennessee and Ohio State tied at No. 4.

As the only two undefeated teams in the country, No. 1 Nebraska and No. 2 Florida were the obvious choices for the national championship game, and they would square off in the Fiesta Bowl to decide the title. The Rose Bowl featured its traditional Big Ten/Pac-10 matchup with No. 3 Northwestern and No. 17 USC. Other major bowl pairings included the two teams tied at No. 4 (Tennessee and Ohio State) facing each other in the Citrus Bowl, No. 6 Notre Dame against No. 8 Florida State in the Orange Bowl, No. 7 Colorado meeting No. 12 Oregon in the Cotton Bowl, and No. 9 Texas (champion of the SWC in that conference's last year of existence) versus Big East-winning No. 13 Virginia Tech in the Sugar Bowl.

Conference standings

No. 1 and No. 2 progress

+Ohio State, a Big Ten school, was not part of the Bowl Alliance.  Florida was No. 3 during weeks 11 through 13.

Bowl games

Fiesta Bowl: No. 1 Nebraska 62, No. 2 Florida 24
Rose Bowl: No. 17 Southern California 41, No. 3 Northwestern 32
Sugar Bowl: No. 13 Virginia Tech 28, No. 9 Texas 10
Orange Bowl: No. 8 Florida State 31, No. 6 Notre Dame 26
Cotton Bowl Classic: No. 7 Colorado 38, No. 12 Oregon 6
: No. 18 Virginia 34, Georgia 27
: No. 4 Tennessee 20, No. 4 Ohio State 14
Outback Bowl: No. 15 Penn State 43, No. 16 Auburn 14
: North Carolina 20, No. 24 Arkansas 10
Sun Bowl: Iowa 38, No. 20 Washington 18
: Syracuse 41, No. 23 Clemson 0
Alamo Bowl: No. 19 Texas A&M 22, No. 14 Michigan 20
: Texas Tech 55, Air Force 41
Holiday Bowl: No. 10 Kansas State 54, Colorado State 21
: East Carolina 19, Stanford 13
: No. 11 Kansas 51, UCLA 30
: LSU 45, Michigan State 26
Las Vegas Bowl: No. 25 Toledo 40, Nevada 37 (OT)

Final AP Poll

 Nebraska
 Florida
 Tennessee
 Florida State
 Colorado
 Ohio State
 Kansas State
 Northwestern
 Kansas
 Virginia Tech
 Notre Dame
 USC
 Penn State
 Texas
 Texas A&M
 Virginia
 Michigan
 Oregon
 Syracuse
 Miami-FL
 Alabama
 Auburn
 Texas Tech
 Toledo
 Iowa

Final Coaches Poll
 Nebraska
 Tennessee
 Florida
 Colorado
 Florida St.
 Kansas St.
 Northwestern
 Ohio St.
 Virginia Tech
 Kansas
 Southern California
 Penn St.
 Notre Dame
 Texas
 Texas A&M
 Syracuse
 Virginia
 Oregon
 Michigan
 Texas Tech
 Auburn
 Iowa
 East Carolina
 Toledo
 LSU

Heisman Trophy voting
The Heisman Memorial Trophy Award is given to the Most Outstanding Player of the year

Winner:
Eddie George, Ohio State, Running Back (1460 votes)
2. Tommie Frazier, Nebraska, QB (1196 votes)
3. Danny Wuerffel, Florida, QB (987 votes)
4. Darnell Autry, Northwestern, RB (534 votes)
5. Troy Davis, Iowa St., RB (402 votes)

Other major awards
Maxwell Award (College Player of the Year) - Eddie George, Ohio State
Walter Camp Award (Back) - Eddie George, Ohio State
Davey O'Brien Award (Quarterback) - Danny Wuerffel, Florida
Johnny Unitas Golden Arm Award (Senior Quarterback) - Tommie Frazier, Nebraska
Doak Walker Award (Running Back) - Eddie George, Ohio State
Fred Biletnikoff Award (Wide Receiver) - Terry Glenn, Ohio State
Bronko Nagurski Trophy (Defensive Player) - Pat Fitzgerald, Northwestern
Dick Butkus Award (Linebacker) - Kevin Hardy, Illinois
Lombardi Award (Lineman or Linebacker) - Orlando Pace, Ohio State
Outland Trophy (Interior Lineman) - Jonathan Ogden, OT, UCLA
Jim Thorpe Award (Defensive Back) - Greg Meyers, Colorado State
Lou Groza Award (Placekicker) - Michael Reeder, TCU
Paul "Bear" Bryant Award - Gary Barnett, Northwestern

References